Sputnik (Спутник, Russian for "satellite") is a spacecraft launched under the Soviet space program. "Sputnik 1", "Sputnik 2" and "Sputnik 3" were the official Soviet names of those objects, and the remaining designations in the series ("Sputnik 4" and so on) were not official names but names applied in the West to objects whose original Soviet names may not have been known at the time.

Spacecraft officially named Sputnik
 Sputnik 1, the first artificial satellite to go into orbit, launched 4 October 1957
 Sputnik 2, the first spacecraft to carry a living animal (the dog Laika) into orbit, launched 3 November 1957
 Sputnik 3, a research satellite launched 15 May 1958

Spacecraft with names containing Sputnik
Being the Russian term for "satellite", the word Sputnik has appeared in the names of other spacecraft:
 Dnepropetrovsk Sputnik, a series of scientific and technology development satellites
 Istrebitel Sputnikov, "Destroyer of Satellites", a series of antisatellite weapons and targets
 Tyazhely Sputnik, "Heavy Satellite", a failed Venus probe
 Upravlyaemy Sputnik, "Controllable Satellite", a series of ocean surveillance and missile detection satellites
US-A, nuclear-powered ocean radar surveillance satellites
US-K, molniya orbit missile detection satellites
US-KS, geosynchronous orbit missile detection satellites
US-KMO, Modernised geosynchronous orbit missile detection satellites
US-P, electronic ocean surveillance satellites
US-PM, modernised electronic ocean surveillance satellites

Spacecraft designated "Sputnik" in the West
These objects are listed with their official Soviet names:
Sputnik 4 – Korabl-Sputnik 1
Sputnik 5 – Korabl-Sputnik 2
Sputnik 6 – Korabl-Sputnik 3
Sputnik 7 – Tyazhely Sputnik
Sputnik 8 – Venera 1
Sputnik 9 – Korabl-Sputnik 4
Sputnik 10 – Korabl-Sputnik 5
Sputnik 11 – Kosmos 1
Sputnik 12 – Kosmos 2
Sputnik 13 – Kosmos 3
Sputnik 14 – Kosmos 4
Sputnik 15 – Kosmos 5
Sputnik 16 – Kosmos 6
Sputnik 17 – Kosmos 7
Sputnik 18 – Kosmos 8
Sputnik 19 – Venera 2MV-1 No.1
Sputnik 20 – Venera 2MV-1 No.2
Sputnik 21 – Venera 2MV-2 No.1
Sputnik 22 – Mars 2MV-4 No.1
Sputnik 23 – Mars 1
Sputnik 24 – Mars 2MV-3 No.1
Sputnik 25 – Luna E-6 No.2

Spacecraft named after Sputnik 1
Sputnik 40
Sputnik 41
Sputnik 99

See also

 Lists of spacecraft

Notes

Lists of spacecraft